The 59th Mobil 1 12 Hours of Sebring presented by Fresh from Florida was held at Sebring International Raceway on March 19, 2011. It was the opening round of the 2011 American Le Mans Series season and the 2011 Intercontinental Le Mans Cup.

Qualifying

Qualifying Result
Pole position winners in each class are marked in bold.

Race

Race result
Class winners in bold.  Cars failing to complete 70% of winner's distance marked as Not Classified (NC).

References

Sebring
12 Hours of Sebring
Sebring
12 Hours of Sebring
12 Hours Of Sebring